William James Arthurs (1888 – July 14, 1971) was a railway conductor and political figure in Saskatchewan. He represented Melville from 1944 to 1948 in the Legislative Assembly of Saskatchewan as a Co-operative Commonwealth Federation (CCF) member.

He was born in Janetville, Ontario, and came to Balcarres, Saskatchewan, in 1905. Arthurs worked for the Canadian National Railway for 40 years, first as a brakeman and then as a conductor; he retired in 1953. He ran unsuccessfully for the Melville seat in the Canadian House of Commons in 1949, losing to James Garfield Gardiner.

References 

Saskatchewan Co-operative Commonwealth Federation MLAs
20th-century Canadian legislators
1888 births
1971 deaths
Conductor (rail)